Castle Rock is an unincorporated community in Castle Rock Township, Dakota County, Minnesota, United States.

Geography
Nearby places also include Farmington and Randolph. State Highway 3 (MN 3) is nearby.

Nomenclature

The community is named for a local rock formation at the point where 275th Street and Cambodia Avenue join, on private property. The formation, known to Dakota Native Americans as Inyan Bosdata or "Rock Standing on End", was also the namesake of the nearby Inyan Bosdata Wakpa, known today as the Cannon River.

History
A post office called Castle Rock was first established in 1858. The community took its name from Castle Rock Township.

Education
The community has a school, Prairie Creek Community School.

See also
 Castle Rock Township

References

Unincorporated communities in Dakota County, Minnesota
Unincorporated communities in Minnesota